Balai Dey (born 11 October 1946) is a retired Indian football player who played as a goalkeeper. He is one of the few footballers who represented the two nations, India and Pakistan, in international football.

In July 2022, Dey was conferred with Lifetime Achievement Award by Mohun Bagan.

Early life
Balai Dey was born on 11 October 1946 in Kotalipara, Gopalganj, Bengal Presidency, during the ending stage of British rule in India. He lived and studied in Khulna as he entered in Satyanarayana School and later studied at St. Joseph's High School till 1964. During his school days, he began playing football and started his youth career as a goalkeeper for Khulna Sporting Club at the age of fifteen.

Club career

In East Pakistan
Dey began his club football career in East Pakistan with then renowned club Khulna Heroes of Khulna First Division League in 1961 after gaining success in playing for local Khulna-based sides. In the Khulna First Division League, his dazzling sportsmanship caught the attention of football fans, and he was picked up by Dhaka League club Dhaka Mohammedan. Two legendary Dhaka Mohammedan players Kabir and Ghaznabi played a crucial role in this transfer.

In 1963 Dhaka League, he helped the team winning the title under the leadership of Abid Hossain, and emerged as one of the best goalkeepers at that time in whole Pakistan. In the league, he stopped so many notable opponents like Dhaka Wanderers Club, Victoria Sporting, Wari Club Dhaka and others. Later, his tremendous performance helped the team winning prestigious Aga Khan Gold Cup in 1964. Dhaka Mohammedan and Karachi Port Trust were joint-winners of the tournament. He also played for Khulna Town Club in 1963.

In India
After his arrival in Calcutta in 1965, Jyoti Prakash Mitra wrote in 1982 in Khelar Kagaz about the journey of Dey from East Pakistan to Pakistan national football team under the headline "Padma to Ganga". He got an invitation to play for Railway FC. On the other hand, Calcutta Football League giants East Bengal was little more concerned about the approval of FIFA's international clearance as he was a foreigner. In 1965, Jyotish Guha managed East Bengal took him as a foreign recruit by surprise where Peter Thangaraj was prominent goalkeeper of the team. Dey later became an Indian citizen but got less opportunities and appeared in only a few matches from 1965 until 1967. Thus he moved to Aryan Club, one of the oldest clubs founded in 1884. With Aryan, he appeared in 1967 Calcutta League and in a match, his goalkeeping helped the team winning 2–1 against Mohun Bagan.

In Indian club football, he was in hard times until his signing with Mohun Bagan in 1968. In 1969, Mohun Bagan clinched the Calcutta Football League title under the guidance of legendary coach Amal Dutta. He also helped the "green and maroons" winning major titles including Rovers Cup in 1968, 1970 and 1971, and IFA Shield in 1969. His goalkeeping for Mohun Bagan at the final of 1969 IFA Shield, helped the team winning the trophy defeating his former club East Bengal 3–1 and it was club's eleventh Shield victory. Amal Dutta was influential nurturing talents including Balai Dey and others like Monoranjan Bhattacharya, Satyajit Chatterjee.

He moved back to East Bengal in 1972 and played consecutively until 1974. During his spells with the "red and gold brigade", he won Calcutta Football League in 1972 and 1973, IFA Shield in 1972 and 1973, Rovers Cup in 1972 and 1973, DCM Trophy in 1973 defeating North Korean side Dok Ro Gang, and Bordoloi Trophy in 1973.

Dey also appeared in the jersey of State Bank of India. Between 1967 and 1970, he represented Bengal in Santosh Trophy and emerged champions in 1969. A standout performance for Bengal earned him a national team call-up. During the national camp in Bombay, Dey had to rush to Nowgon, Assam, in a few hours' notice after receiving an SOS from the Bengal team management and participated in the Santosh Trophy. In final, they defeated Services by 6–1.

International career

Pakistan
After Dey's brilliant performance with Dhaka Mohammedan in tournaments in Karachi, Lahore, Peshawar and Multan, he got a chance for trial in the Pakistan national team. In the 1950s, very few players from East Pakistan were called up to the national team while fewer got the opportunity to play in the starting XI.

After the memorable performances against Singapore and Sri Lanka, Dey and Jahurul Hoque from East Pakistan earned a spot in the national squad. Despite the dominance of the Makranis, he went to play with the national team in Chinese Republic Day Football Tournament in 1964. After his heroic goalkeeping for Pakistan against the powerful Baku XI team of the Soviet Union in Chittagong, 1964, every national newspaper of Pakistan gave the title "Flying Bird".

India
After representing Pakistan, he got the honor of playing in India national football team in 1969 after gaining Indian citizenship. He competed in the Merdeka Cup in Malaysia and the Singapore Friendship Tournament, when Jarnail Singh was the national team head coach. In Merdeka, he earned the nickname "Indian Rock". In 1970, he played in the Friendship Tournament in Iran.

Personal life

Dey's twin brother Kanai Dey was also a football goalkeeper who played in Khulna First Division League. Balai Dey got the opportunity to play for the Pakistan national team during a tour of the Soviet Union in 1965, but due to family constraints, he moved to Calcutta, India on January 3, 1975 and settled in Liluah, Howrah. He was admitted to Jagannath College in Dhaka for IA and later to Surendranath College of the University of Calcutta, and did not go far to play. He got married in 1981.

Post-playing career
After retiring from football, Dey began his coaching career with sub-junior teams of Mohun Bagan Athletic Club. He then earned a job at State Bank of India and later retired in 2006. Dey also worked as coach of Liluah Suryanagar Maitri Sangha club.

Honours
Dhaka Mohammedan
Dhaka Football League: 1963
Aga Khan Gold Cup: 1964
East Bengal
Calcutta Football League: 1966, 1972, 1973
Durand Cup: 1972
Rovers Cup: 1972, 1973
DCM Trophy: 1973
Bordoloi Trophy: 1972, 1973
Mohun Bagan
Calcutta Football League: 1969
IFA Shield: 1969
Rovers Cup: 1968, 1970, 1971
Bengal
Santosh Trophy: 1969–70; runner-up 1967–68, 1968–69
Individual
Mohun Bagan Lifetime Achievement Award: 2022

See also
 List of association footballers who have been capped for two senior national teams
 List of Indian football players in foreign leagues
 Indian naturalized football players
 India–Pakistan football rivalry

Notes

References

Bibliography

External links

Living people
1946 births
People from Gopalganj District, Bangladesh
Indian footballers
Pakistani footballers
Association football goalkeepers
Expatriate footballers in India
Indian expatriate footballers
Asian Games competitors for India
Footballers from Dhaka
Mohammedan SC (Dhaka) players
India international footballers
Pakistan international footballers
Pakistani emigrants to India
Indian expatriate sportspeople in Bangladesh
East Bengal Club players
Mohun Bagan AC players
Aryan FC players
Calcutta Football League players
Dual internationalists (football)